Abasha is a town in Georgia.

Abasha may also refer to:
Abasha Municipality, a municipality in Georgia
Abasha (river), a river in Georgia
Abasha, a variant name of Abyssinia
Abasha, a variant name of the Habesha people
Abasha, a snack in Nigeria made of cassava chips
Abasha, a diminutive form of "Abakum", a variant of the Russian male first name Avvakum